Rugir may refer to:
Rugir-e Hajji Mohammad Taqi
Rugir-e Hasani
Rugir-e Qaleh Hajji
Rugir-e Taj Amiri